The 1974 WQXI Can-Am was the second round of the 1974 Can-Am season.  It was held July 7, 1974, at Road Atlanta in Braselton, Georgia.  It was the fifth Can-Am race held at the track.

Results
Pole position: George Follmer, 1:14.9
Fastest lap: Jackie Oliver, 1:16.1
Race distance:  (1 hour duration)
Winner's average speed: 
Attendance: 15,000

References

External links
Race results from World Sports Racing Prototypes
Race results from Ultimate Racing History

Road Atlanta
Road Atlanta Can-Am
Road Atlanta Can-Am
Road Atlanta Can-Am